, also known as Kichō (帰蝶), was the legal wife of Oda Nobunaga, a major daimyō during the Sengoku period of Japanese history. Her proper name was Kichō, but since she came from Mino Province, she is most commonly referred to as Nōhime ("Lady of Mino"; Nō is an abbreviation for Nōshū (濃州), other name of Mino Province, and hime means "lady, princess, noblewoman").  She was renowned for her beauty and cleverness.

Nōhime's father was the daimyo Saitō Dōsan and her mother was known as Omi no Kata. Nō herself appears very little in any historical record, and there is little information on the dates of her birth or death; however, proposed dates for her birth fall in 1533–35. According to one historical record, Lady Nō was infertile, and when Nobunaga's concubine Lady Kitsuno gave birth to Oda Nobutada, the child was given to Lady Nō, Nobunaga's legal wife, to be raised as Nobunaga's heir.

Marriage to Nobunaga 

Nō was said to be extremely intelligent and stunningly beautiful. At their wedding, Nobunaga described her as having "the mind of a genius and the appearance of a goddess." She was married to him in 1549, during a truce between his father, Nobuhide, and hers (Saitō Dōsan).

The marriage is believed to have been a political gesture, with little actual love between them. Although she was his official wife, it is often believed that he focused his love on his concubine, Kitsuno, who bore him his first son, Nobutada. Nō was never able to conceive a child with Nobunaga, and it was believed that she was infertile.

Due to the lack of historical record, there is not much information as to what became of Nō or even the date of her death. Overall, it can be said that her life as it is now known is more of a tentative mixture of legends, folktales and half-truths. Nō's official grave is at Sōken-in, a subtemple of Daitoku-ji in Kyoto.

Legends and speculation
One theory posits that Nō was acting as a spy, or even assassin, for her father; at that time it was not an uncommon practice for a wife to relay information to her maiden family. Given Nobunaga's reputation at the time as the unruly "Fool of Owari" (Owari no Utsuke 尾張の虚け), it was also not impossible for Dōsan to want Nō to assassinate him, as she was skilled in both the sword and a selection of martial arts.

As for her alleged role as a spy, there is a popular story where Nobunaga purposely gave Nō false information regarding a conspiracy between two of her father's head servants and their plans to betray him. Her father had both men executed, and thus weakened himself by eliminating those loyal to him.

In 1556, Nō's father was killed in a coup carried out by his own son, Yoshitatsu, in Mino Province. This reduced Nō's value as a wife. Her inability to conceive and her supposed spying were held against her. She influenced Oda Nobunaga to invade Mino after her father was killed by her brother. Yoshitatsu would die in 1561. Succeeded by a less-than-capable heir (Tatsuoki), the Saito clan would be defeated in the Siege of Inabayama. Nobunaga and Nō would rebuild it as Gifu Castle, becoming an important Oda clan outpost.

Incident at Honnō-ji 
The fate of Nōhime is uncertain, but it is said that she died in the flames of Honno-ji while fighting with her naginata against enemy soldiers. However it is said that she managed to survive the battle and escaped the flames of Kyoto alive.

After the Honnō-ji Incident which claimed the lives of Nobunaga and his son Nobutada, it was uncertain where Nō went. Some speculate that she died at Honnō-ji, but the woman alleged to be Nō was more often believed to be a retired prostitute to whom Oda Nobunaga had taken a liking. Nevertheless, after the incident, Nobunaga's wives and female servants were all sent to Azuchi Castle, which was Nobunaga's castle of residence. Among the women was a certain Lady Azuchi (安土殿 Azuchi dono), who was taken in by Nobunaga's second son, Nobukatsu. This Lady Azuchi is widely believed to have been Nō in disguise as she soon after disappeared from the castle into the night.

Other survival theories 
Afterwards, it was often rumoured that she had attempted to raise her father's clan in Mino under her name, but was killed by an assassin sent by the Akechi, who had been tracking her since her escape from Honnō-ji.

The most commonly accepted form of Nō’s life after the death of Nobunaga is that she was under the care of her adopted son Nobukatsu until he was defeated by Toyotomi Hideyoshi, then was under the care of the Toyotomi until her death in 1612.

In fiction 

 In the Samurai Warriors franchise, she is portrayed as a sultry and deadly woman who fights using assassin weapons and bombs. Her relationship with Nobunaga is portrayed as a toxic love, with her always trying to kill her husband and Nobunaga considering it a fun game. However, their relationship tends to change based on the game.
 In the Sengoku Basara game and anime series, she is depicted as a beautiful and elegant woman who is loyal to her husband, with matchlock pistols, jackhammers and guns as weapons.
 In the game Nioh, she appears as a yuki-onna. She was resurrected by the main antagonist and was killed in one-on-one battle with the main protagonist after he is dispatched to Honnō-ji temple to solve mystery behind the snow that appeared out of nowhere in middle of June. In the fight, she uses ice magic and naginata made out of ice. She reappears in the prequel Nioh 2 as the half-sister of the main protagonist Hide, and ends up dying in the Honnoji incident alongside her husband Nobunaga.

References

1530s births
1612 deaths
16th-century Japanese women
17th-century Japanese women
Oda clan
People of Sengoku-period Japan
Saitō clan
Women of medieval Japan
16th-century Japanese people
17th-century Japanese people